Tillebrook Provincial Park is a provincial park located in Alberta, Canada.

It was established on July 20, 1965 and is maintained by Alberta Tourism, Parks and Recreation. A camping site is maintained within the grounds.

See also
List of provincial parks in Alberta
List of Canadian provincial parks
List of National Parks of Canada

External links

County of Newell
Provincial parks of Alberta